Al Masry Sporting Club is an Egyptian sports club based in Port Said, Egypt. The club is mainly known for its professional football team, that competes in the Egyptian Premier League, the highest division of the Egyptian football league system.

Al Masry has never won the league, but won their one Egyptian Cup in 1998. The club plays their home matches at the Port Said Stadium, with a capacity of 17,988.

History
Founded on 18 March 1920 by a group of Egyptians in Port Said, it was the first club for Egyptians in a city that already had many clubs for the foreign communities living there.

In February 2012 the Port Said Stadium disaster took place, where rioting Masry fans caused the deaths of 72 rival fans, and hundreds of injuries. 69 Masry fans were convicted, with 26 receiving the death penalty, and numerous others receiving life sentences.

After the riots, the remainder of the 2011–12 Egyptian Premier League season was cancelled by the Egyptian Football Association. Al Masry decided to refrain from competing in the 2012–13 season as a sign of respect to the relatives of the victims of the disaster, although it obtained a decision from the Court of Arbitration for Sport (CAS) confirming the club's right to participate in the Egyptian Premier League and all other activities of the Egyptian Football Association. Nevertheless, 2012–13 season was not completed and was cancelled due to the political situation in Egypt.

Al Masry resumed participation in the Egyptian Premier League in the 2013–14 season; the club suffered from unstable performance and results for two consecutive seasons, although it maintained its position in the Egyptian Premier League. Al Masry started the 2015–16 season under the coaching of the Egyptian former player of the team Hossam Hassan, who adopted a new policy depending on youth and unknown players. That season the team came in at fourth place in the Egyptian Premier League and succeeded to qualify to the CAF Confederation Cup after 14 years of absence from African completions.

Colours and crest

Al Masry's crest is composed of a green pharaonic Horus eagle that holds the Sun disk over its head in between its two upraised wings; the crest was inspired by the shape of Tutankhamun's pendants referring to challenge and strength, so the team is nicknamed the green eagles. The club's main colours, green and white come from Egypt's flag after the Egyptian Revolution of 1919 as a symbol of patriotism.

Stadiums

Al Masry formerly played their home games at a small stadium in Port Said, but its capacity was too small for the club's support. As a consequence, Al Masry built its own new stadium which is named Port Said Stadium in 1953 and was officially inaugurated in 1955.

Sayed Metwally Complex 

The Sayed Metwally Complex is the training center of Egyptian multi-sport club Al Masry SC. It has two grass pitches and is mainly used by the senior squad and the youth teams. It was renovated in 2011 to be ready to host the training sessions of the first team and its friendly matches. In November 2013 Al Masry board of directors took a decision to name the Pitches after the club's late president Sayed Metwally who took the office for almost 26 years.

Presidents

Honours
Egypt Cup
 Winners (1): 1998
 Runners-up (9): 1927, 1945, 1947, 1954, 1957, 1983, 1984, 1989, 2017
Sultan Hussein Cup
 Winners (3): 1933, 1934, 1937
 Runners-up (1): 1938
EFA Revitalization Cup
 Winners (1): 1992  (shared record)
 Runners-up (1): 1989

Regional
Canal Zone League
 Winners (17): 1932, 1933, 1934, 1935, 1936, 1937, 1938, 1939, 1940, 1941, 1942, 1943, 1944, 1945, 1946, 1947, 1948 (record)

Performance in CAF competitions
PR = Preliminary round
FR = First round
SR = Second round
PO = Play-off round
QF = Quarter-final
SF = Semi-final

Notes

Performance in Arab competitions
Arab Cup Winners' Cup: 1 appearance
1999 – Bronze Medalist
Arab Champions League: 1 appearance
2008 – First Round

IFFHS rankings

Club world ranking
These are the footballdatabase club's points 3 June 2018.

CAF club rankings
These are the footballdatabase club's points 3 June 2018.

National club rankings
These are the footballdatabase club's points 3 June 2018.

Players

Current squad

Coaching staff

Captains

 01-  Ali Mabrouk
 02-  Hassan Al-Deeb
 03-  Helmi Mostafa
 04-  Abdulrahman Fawzi
 05-  Mohammed Hassan
 06-  Mohammed Gouda
 07-  Hamdeen Al-Zamek
 08-  Aly Helal
 09-  El-Sayed El-Tabei
 10-  El-Sayed Ali
 11-  Munir Gerges (Al-lewy)
 12-  Adel Al-Gazar
 13-  Mohamed Shahen
 14-  Aboud El Khodary
 15-  Mosaad Nour
 16-  Tarek Soliman
 17-  Mostafa Abu-Dahab
 18-  El-Sayed Eid
 19-  Ali Al-Said
 20-  Talaat Mansour
 21-  Ibrahim El-Masry
 22-  Mohamed Omar (Al-Ako)
 23-  Amr Al-Desoky
 24-  Abdallah Ragab
 25-  Hossam Hassan
 26-  Karim Zekri
 27-  Mohamed Gouda
 28-  Mohamed Ashour El-Adham
 29-  Akwety Mensah
 30-  Amr Al-Desoky
 31-  Mohamed Ashour El-Adham
 32-  Osama Azab
 33-  Ahmed Fawzi
 34-  Karim Zekri
 35-  Mohamed Ashour El-Adham
 36-  Osama Azab
 37-  Islam Salah

Managers

 Mahmoud El-Gohary
 Ferenc Puskás (1979–82)
 Wojciech Łazarek (1 July 1992 – 30 June 1993)
 Ahmed Rifaat (9 July 1996 – 26 Oct 1996)
 Michael Krüger (1 Jan 1998 – 31 Oct 1998)
 Mohsen Saleh (12 Oct 1998 – 10 Dec 1998)
 Zlatko Kranjčar (1 Feb 1999 – 30 June 2000)
 Mahmoud Abou-Regaila (1 Aug 2000 – 26 Nov 2001)
 Abdul-Aziz Abdul-Shafi (27 Nov 2001 – 1 July 2002)
 Tarek Soliman (9 Dec 2001 – 28 Jan 2002)
 Fuad Muzurović (1 July 2002 – 30 Dec 2002)
 Farouk Gaafar (1 July 2004 – 1 Dec 2004)
 Otto Pfister (1 July 2005 – Sept 22, 2005)
 Alexandru Moldovan (Aug 2006 – Sept 06)
 Mohamed Omar (Sept 28, 2006–07)
 Tarek Soliman (interim) (1 April 2007 – 30 June 2007)
 Helmy Toulan (1 July 2007 – 1 Nov 2007)
 Hossam Hassan (29 Feb 2008 – 28 Dec 2008)
 Tarek Soliman (interim) (28 Dec 2008 – 11 Feb 2009)
 Bertalan Bicskei (11 Feb 2009 – 29 Aug 2009)
 Anwar Salama (29 Aug 2009 – 24 Jan 2010)
 Theo Bücker (29 Jan 2010 – 4 May 2010)
 Mohammed Helmy (4 May 2010 – 26 May 2010)
 Mokhtar Mokhtar (1 June 2010 – 26 Nov 2010)
 Alaa Mayhoob (interim) (27 Nov 2010 – 16 Dec 2010)
 Alain Geiger (16 Dec 2010 – 6 April 2011)
 Tarek El Sawy (6 April 2011 – 4 May 2011)
 Taha Basry (4 May 2011 – 13 July 2011)
 Talaat Youssef (17 July 2011 – 15 Jan 2012)
 Hossam Hassan (15 Jan 2012 – 13 May)
 Sabry El-Menyawy (18 Aug 2013 – 21 Jan 2014)
 Anwar Salama (22 Jan 2014 – 14 May 2014)
 Tarek Soliman (interim) (14 May 2014 – 13 July 2014)
 Tarek Yehia (13 July 2014 – 16 Dec 2014)
 Juan José Maqueda (20 Dec 2014 – 28 Apr 2015)
 Mokhtar Mokhtar (28 Apr 2015 – 24 July 2015)
 Hossam Hassan (25 July 2015 – 28 October 2018)
 Ehab Galal (15 December 2018 – 20 February 2020)
 Tarek El Ashry (20 February 2020 – 31 August 2020)
 Ali Maher (31 August 2020 – 3 September 2021)
 Moïne Chaâbani (12 September 2021 – 29 May 2022)
 Hossam Hassan (29 May 2022 – 31 August 2022)
 Ehab Galal (8 September – ?)
 Hossam Hassan (14 December 202/ – present)

Other sports
Al Masry SC also competes in other sports, such as handball, athletics, swimming, gymnastics, billiards, table tennis and field hockey.

Al Masry FM Radio
Al Masry FM is the official radio station of the club; it was launched as an Internet radio station on 28 December, making it Egypt's first radio station belonging to a club.

Sponsors
Nike
Presentation Sports
WE
GLC
SAIBBank
OPPO
EGYPTAIR

See also
 Egyptian Premier League
 Egypt Cup
 Sultan Hussein Cup

References

External links
 Official website
 El-Masry fans official website 
 Website (in arabic)
 Masry Club FU
 Masry Lovers
 Masry Eagles

 
Football clubs in Port Said
Association football clubs established in 1920
1920 establishments in Egypt
Multi-sport clubs in Egypt